The Iloilo–Capiz Road is a , north–south lateral highway that connects the city of Iloilo in the province of Iloilo to the city of Roxas in the province of Capiz, Philippines.

The road is a component of National Route 5 (N5) and National Route 505 (N505) of the Philippine highway network, as well as the Western Nautical Highway of the Philippine Nautical Highway System.

History

Route description

Iloilo City to Passi 
The road starts near the kilometer zero of Panay Island at Arroyo Fountain rotonda in Iloilo City.

Passi to Ivisan

Ivisan to Roxas 
From Ivisan poblacion, it turns east towards Roxas City. It then veers north towards the Roxas City poblacion, where the road becomes locally known as Roxas Avenue. It crosses the Panay River and meets the Roxas City Fountain roundabout, where it transitions from N5 to N505 and turns to the west. It turns north as its newer route, locally known as Arnaldo Boulevard, facilitating access to the Roxas Airport and Port of Culasi. It meets the northern coast of Panay Island and ends at the intersection with Roxas City Circumferential Road at the Port of Culasi.

Intersections

Spurs and bypasses

Jaro Spur Road 

The Jaro Spur Road is a  spur road that serves as the main bypass road for Iloilo–Capiz Road in Jaro, Iloilo City.

Intersections

References 

Roads in Iloilo
Roads in Capiz